Lahejia is a genus of leaf beetles in the subfamily Eumolpinae. It is known from Africa and Asia. It is related to Malegia.

Taxonomy
The genus was first created in 1896 by Charles Joseph Gahan for the single species Lahejia cinerascens, which was collected by Lieutenant-Colonel  from Lahij, Yemen (spelled as "Lahej" in the paper). In 2002, Stefano Zoia determined that Pseudomalegia (a genus created by Martin Jacoby in 1897) was a synonym of Lahejia, transferring to the latter genus six more species (while a seventh became a synonym of L. cinerascens). In 2010, two further species were moved to the genus from Microlypesthes and Malegia in the sixth volume of the Catalogue of Palaearctic Coleoptera.

Species
 Lahejia aenea (Chen, 1940)
 Lahejia cinerascens Gahan, 1896
 Lahejia fulvipes  (Jacoby, 1898)
 Lahejia jacobsoni (Sumakov, 1901)
 Lahejia lefevrei  (Jacoby, 1897)
 Lahejia minuta  (Weise, 1919)
 Lahejia schimperi  (Lefèvre, 1891)
 Lahejia tibialis  (Jacoby, 1901)
 Lahejia turkestanica (Reitter, 1890)

References

Eumolpinae
Chrysomelidae genera
Beetles of Africa
Beetles of Asia